The Begatting of the President is a satirical album narrated by Orson Welles, summarising the presidency of Lyndon B. Johnson and the election of 1968, leading up to the election of Richard Nixon, delivered in the style of Biblical verse.

Production
The album's script was written by Myron Roberts, Lincoln Haynes and Sasha Gilien, and was simultaneously published by Ballantine Books. The album was produced by Mediarts Records, a small record label co-founded by former Capitol Records executive Alan W. Livingston, and was Mediarts' second release, after Dory Previn's On My Way to Where.

Orson Welles was selected as the deadpan narrator due to his already being an established narrator, including on Biblical epics such as King of Kings (1961). Luchi de Jesus provided the album's incidental music.

Contents

Track 1 – L.B. Jenesis

In the beginning, LBJ created the Great Society. And darkness was upon the face of the Republicans. And the spirit of consensus moved across the land. And LBJ said, "Let us continue". And they continued. And the Evening and Morning were the First Day. And LBJ said, "Let us make War on Poverty." And Lo, there were welfare cheques fallen upon the land. And upon them it was writ, "Fold not, neither shall ye spindle, nor mutilate." And LBJ saw that it was Good. 
And the Evening and Morning were the Second Day. And LBJ said, "Let there be a Civil Rights Covenant to Unite the Children of Light and Darkness." And so it came to pass the Congress. 
The Evening and the Morning were the Third Day. And LBJ said, "Let there be Medicare, so that the Sick be Healed and the Doctors paid under the fullest measure thereof." And LBJ saw that it was paid. 
And the Evening and the Morning were the Fourth Day. And LBJ said, "Let there be Bureaus and Departments Without Number, and let They be Fruitful and Multiply so that every creature that flyeth, creepeth or voteth shall be blessed with patronage in his own precinct." And LBJ saw that it was finger-lickin' good. 
And the Evening and the Morning were the Fifth Day. And LBJ said, "Let there be nuclear non-proliferation, and let the Capitalist lay down with the Commissar, so that they may exchange corn and culture." And LBJ pulled out his Poll and saw that it was Good, even unto the Tenth Cubit. 
And the Evening and the Morning were the Sixth Day. And LBJ saw the Society that was made, and Lo, it was Great! 
And on the Seventh Day, He gave a Barbecue. Still, LBJ rested not from his labours, but said, "Shucks, Let there be an Eighth Day." 
And on the Eighth Day, He Escalated.

Track 2 – The Defoliation of Eden

Now LBJ said, "Let us make a Voter in our image, that he may glorify us, and elect us forever." And He had it made. Then LBJ said, "It is not meet that Man should vote alone." So He caused a deep sleep to fall upon the Man, while His eyes grew heavy with The Late Show, and He took one of the ribs from His TV dinner, and with it he fashioned a woman, and He called their names Adam and Eve, and they were both Registered Democrats, and they were not ashamed. 
And He gave unto them a tract and a house, which he called, "Eden Estates". And LBJ said unto Adam and Eve, "Of every fruit of the Great Society ye may eat. But of the fruit of Dissent, ye shall not eat, for on that day ye shall surely Doubt. Wherefore ye shall not tune the tube onto the forbidden channel of Fulbright, nor seek to understand the accursed [Code of Morse." 
Wherefore did they gather then before the tube, for truly that was the Light of the World. And Adam rested, beside his six-pack, and beheld the eternal cow herds beset by the feathered tribes of Jeronimo. But unto Eve, this was an abomination, and a drag. Now did Adam drift off to the Land of Nod. And there entered into Eden Estates an Intellectual, who was more subtle than any Serpent. And he said unto the Woman, "Thou mayest indeed tune unto the forbidden channel, and see it like it is, baby." And lo, she beheld a Flash of Light, and great speckled birds of flight from the sky, hurling bolts of flame upon the hamlets of the bearded prophet Ho. And there was a great battle. And its name was Tet. And it was offensive.
Now when Eve beheld this, she was sore afraid and cried out, so that Adam awakened. And he said, "What manner of channel beholdest thou? This scene is forbidden! And for this disobedience, LBJ shall surely smite thee." But in her Pride, Eve answered, "Stupid, thy brain hath been washed. Remove the veil from thine eyes." Wherefore did Adam look, and the scene changed to Chambers of the Senators. And it was Fulbright who did speak like unto a Dove: "This War profiteth ye not, nor doth it succour our sons. Therefore Escalate not, lest ye be Escalated." 
Whereupon did the Heavens thunder, and there was a flash of lightning and a mighty blast of the Texas Longhorn, and lo, the Omnipotent One appeared, surrounded by his Host of cherubim, and foremost among these was the Angel Rusk, who said, "Ye shall honour your commitments before the SEATO of the Mighty, all the rest of your days." 
And unto Adam and Eve spake LBJ, "Who first seduced ye unto this foul revolt?" Whereupon did Eve cry out, "The Intellectual. It was he who turned me on." Then did LBJ say unto the Intellectual, "Because thou hast done this thing, thou art accursed, and thy head shall be of egg." And unto Adam and Eve he said, "Because ye have been disobedient, and harkened over the Dissenter, a surtax shall be laid upon ye: Inflation shall be visited upon your heads, and your stocks and bonds shall be brought low."
Therefore did LBJ banish them east of Eden Estates, and they wandered in desolation until they came to a place called Credibility Gap.

Track 3 – Burn, Pharaoh, Burn

Now the sons of Adam were fruitful, and there was affluence in the land. But among the children of the Great Society, there were those whose skins were black. And lo, their portion was niggardly, and of the fatted calf they were left sucking hind teat. And they were the pickers of cotton and shiners of shoes. For in the words of the White Psalmist, "They had plenty of nothing, and nothing is plenty for them." And it was decreed that they should sit apart from the seats of the Mighty, yea, even unto the Restrooms. 
Now it came to pass that a prophet rose up amongst them. And they called him "King". And he went unto Pharaoh and said, "Let my people go to the front of the bus", wherefore King assembled a great host, and he assembled them unto the Lunch Counters of the land, and he asked for bread and they gave him a stone in the head. And he was set upon by fierce dogs, which are the man's best friend. 
Now the Avenging Angel Carmichael cried out, "Give me some men who are black-hearted men! For ours is the Kingdom and the Glory, and the Black Power." And the young men girded up their loins and there were Burnt Offerings in the streets, and the summer waxed, long and hot. And it was the Molotov cocktail Hour. And there was a gnashing of teeth, and a smashing of windows. And the people descended upon the merchants, and lo, there was Instant Credit. And the man was Wrath, and he smote them with the back of his lash.
Then the King spake: "Render unto Sears the things that are Sears', for what profiteth a man to gain a colour television set, and lose his soul, brother?"
And the King journeyed to the city of Memphis, where he spake unto the collectors of offal, and he said, "Ye Shall Overcome." But an assassin rose up against him, and he slew the King. And there were wailings and lamentations in the land. 
Then a man rose from the South of Eden, and he was called Josh Wallace. And he was stood at the Great Gate of the Temple at Bam, and shouted, "If you're black, get ye back!" And he said, "Of the Lord am I now come to rid the Earth of these pigs, perverts and punks which are a pestilence upon the land." 
And he went into the fields and into the towns and into the suburbs, and gathered together all those who despised miscegenation, integration and education. "Let us go against these rebellious sons and proud judges of this Earth, and teach 'em that he that lieth down before our chariots shall not rise again!" And he summoned unto him a mighty warrior, Curtains LeMay, and Wallace said unto him, "Wilt thou make a covenant that together, we shall go into Jericho, and smite the sinners therein?" And LeMay said "Yea verily, let us scourge them with fire! And SAC their cities, that all the evil work they have ever done under the sun shall be vaporised into a cloud, like unto a mushroom." And Josh stayed his hand, and sayeth, "It is not meet that ye speak thus before the election, for a little bird shall hear thy words, and carry them unto the Media. And the people will fear us."
They gathered together a mighty host, and the people saw them and cried out, "Look, a white tornado hath come to cleanse the land!" Then Wallace gathered his police together and blew a mighty blast on his bullhorn, and cried, "Elect me, and there will be a great Dixie fry!"

Track 4 – The Coming of Richard

Now before this came to pass, the Lord God planted a garden east of Whittier, at a place called Yorba Linda. And a child, Richard, there grew to manhood. And he was righteous. And he took to wife, the damsel, Pat. And she was righteous. And they were righteous together. For they knew not wine nor strong drink, and their status was Middle-Middle, and they offended not, and the number of their cavities were fewer, and they suffered not irregularity, for they were chosen among all men.
And one day, a deep sleep fell upon Richard, and there appeared an Angel of the Lord, which said unto him: "Fear not, oh Richard. For yea, though thy beard be black, and thy jowls pendulous, thou art comely and glory shall one day be thine." Whence came it that Richard was filled with the Holy Spirit of ambition, for he was a low-potential high achiever, and he tried harder that he might be Number One. 
And the Elders asked, "Who should be our Champion, that we may be saved from the scourge of the New Dealers?" And they read a Classified Ad upon the tablet, saying, "Wanted: Future Pharaoh. Pigmentation must not be unseemly, neither shall he partake of the Feast of Unleavened Bread", for they were not equal opportunity employers.
Whence came young Richard, and he sayeth, "Yea verily, and I shall sweep the Liberals before me, and sting the Democrats with a swarm of wasps." And They found his words gracious, and sent him to the Wicked City of Washington.
Now it came to pass that Ike ruled over the land, and he summoned young Richard unto him, saying, "Art thou clean as a hound's tooth?" And Richard went before the Media, and cried, "I am clean! I am innocent! And my wife weareth a Republican cloth coat!" Wherefore did Richard sit at Ike's right hand, and it was a time of peace. And the time Ike ruled over the land was eight years, and he grew old, wherefore he chose Nixon to reign in his stead, saying, "Kings are not always wise – sometimes they're just there." And Nixon journeyed unto the Land of the Latins, but they liked him not, and spat upon him; and he journeyed into the Land of the False Prophet Marx, and he went into their kitchens, and spat in their Borscht, and when he returned, the people muttered, "Is he not over-much righteous?" 
And there rose up against him a young prophet, John, of the tribe of Joseph, a man of many Talents, and leader of a mighty clan. And he took Nixon by his beard, and Broadcast him down. And Richard's heart grew sad, and he walked through the Valley of the Shadow of the Losers. 
Whence did he hide back to California, where he strove to be Chief. And he was beaten. And when the Scribes came unto him, he said, "Yea, I asked for votes. Ye gave me The Shaft. Woe unto ye. For ye shall not have Nixon to smite around anymore." And Richard departed alone. And the Liberals laughed and mocked him. And he got no heat, and he died. And he was four years dead.

Track 5 – The Pacification of Goliath

But now, the winter was passing, and the stickers were brought forth abundantly on the bumpers, and the voice of The Candidate was heard in the land. Then the Democrats gathered together their armies at New Hampshire, and the Regulars stood on a mountain at the Right Side, and the Dissenters stood on the mountain at the Left Side, and between was the Valley of the Generation gap. 
Now there came out of Washington the Champion of the Regulars, LBJ, whose height was six cubits and a span. And when he spake, the young men trembled, for there was a Mighty Draft. And he stood and cried out to the armies of the Dissenters, "Wherefore come ye forth to challenge me, am I not your Chieftain? And are ye not servants of the party? Have I not brought you blessings without number? Ye hath never had it so good!"
Then the Dissenters spake out, "Hypocrite! Thou cryest 'Peace! Peace!', but there is no peace! The words of thy mouth are as honey! But thy deeds as gall! And thou goest in stiff-necked pride! Wherefore our sons are sacrificed, wherefore thou mayest play Texas Ranger to the world!" But still no man in their ranks had heart to go forth and battle the Giant, LBJ.
And it came to pass that there rose among them a shepherd from the Hills of Minnesota, who was called Eugene. And he cried out, "Who is this uncircumcised philistine, that he should mock the young Liberals? I shall smite him in the Primaries, and deliver ye from his Hand, and the children shall lead me." 
And the scribes mocked him, saying, "Precinct captains hast thou none, nor talents of silver. Lucky thine are to deliver thine own state." And Eugene took up his sling and drew near to the Giant. But the Giant disdained him and said, "Thinkest thou I fear thy sling? Surely thou knowest? I am the mightiest slinger of them all!" But Eugene feared not. Then it was that he took up the Peace Vote, and slang it. And it smote LBJ between the Polls. And the Giant fell upon his face, and the Earth trembled. And the Regulars were sore amazed, and they turned and fled. And the Dissenters rose and shouted, "Eugene, thou art a mighty candidate! Lead us now into Convention, and deliver us from Evil." And Eugene, in the fullness of victory, accepted their homage. 
And there suddenly appeared before them Bobby, Son of Joseph and Brother of John, and he said, "Lo, I have reassessed. Follow me, that we may go forward." And many among the people reached to touch his raiment and the locks of his hair, and he too was a Candidate.
Then the fallen Giant LBJ raised his head and said, "There is a Time for War and a Time for Peace, a Time to Run and a Time to Split." Wherefore did Lady Bird say unto him, "Offer peace unto the sons of Ho, and let us return to the banks of Pedernales, and we shall deposit therein."

Track 6 – Paradise Bossed

Now Bobby was a hairy man. He was the son of many-shekelled Joseph, and brother of John, who was King of Kings. And many sons and daughters were given unto him, for he was fruitful and multiplied past all understanding. 
Whilst but a youth, he rose up in righteousness, and smote the Hoffite King of the Charioteers. Many sons of Ham, and Eggheads, sought out Bobby, to hear his wisdom which God had put into his heart. And he stood up, beautiful before all men. 
Then it came to pass that John was foully slain, and thrones were cast down, and there was a falling-off. And Bobby's place at the Lord's right hand was taken by the Archangel Hubert, whose mouth was full of tongue. And there were murmurings of discontent amongst the people.
Wherefore did LBJ summon Bobby unto him and say, "Art thou he that troubleth my reign? And sacrificed not unto me?" And Bobby answered him, "I have troubled not thy reign, but thou Usurper King in my brother's reign hast gone whoring after the Generals. Thou hast impoverished the spirit. Where once stood Pablo Casals, thou bringest in Martha Raye." And did LBJ command, "Get thee handsome show off thy face, lest I cast thee into a barbecue pit of fire and brimstone. And take thine accursed Eggheads with thee!" Wherefore did Bobby gather his brethren and go forth into exile. And at his side was Galbraith, Apostle of Affluence, whose thoughts like his bulk towered over all men. And there also went Schlesinger the Scribe, and Sorenson the Holy Ghost, and sundry sons of Harvard, thinkers all, and builders of the Lofty Premise. 
And Bobby summoned his counsellors, and said, "Soon there shall come The Election. Shall it fall on me? Shall we take arms against this Sea of Texans, and by opposing, end them?" But the counsellors replied, "Strive not with this mighty man, lest he take thee by the forelock, and he will surely shear thee like a sheep. Let not thy strength be wasted, keep thy counsel, and observe the opportunity." And Bobby harkened unto them, for he knew that it was writ, "You can't smite City Hall."
But then Bobby's heart was moved, and he entered the fray, and lo, the people enlisted under his banner and cried out, "Oh Bobby, brother of Jack, lead us out of this wilderness, lest we perish." And he went into the Primaries. The States gave way before his mighty host. And he came unto a place called California, where he strove mightily with his foes. And he was victorious. 
And then a foul assassin, a Son of Ishmael, rose up against him, and he was slain. And strong men wept. And the people were sore afraid. And the Houses were in mourning. For those who had seen a Great Light saw only Darkness now. And they sat upon the ground, and wept.

Track 7 – The Raising of Richard

Now it came to pass that the Republicans saw there was confusion amongst their enemies, and the new election would fall upon them, and they asked, "But who is there to lead us, that we may cast out the Democrats, and dwell in the Tents of Power?" And they searched their hearts. 
Some amongst them cried out for Romney, the Rambler, but the chieftains beheld him and saw that his brain had been washed. And others cried out for Rockefeller, for lo his name ringeth of bullion, but the chiefs regarded him, and found a taint, for he had drunk not from the Cup of Gold Water. And there was Ronald, he of The Late, Late Show, and the South clave unto him, but the delegates cast him forth, for he was not the Hero, but the Hero's Best Friend. Wherefore they cried out, "Could we but raise Richard from the dead, we should have a mighty champion and slayer of Democrats." And the Republicans said unto themselves, "We are the Resurrection and the Life and the Law and the Order, he that believeth in us, though he were dead, yet he shall live." But the supporters of Rocky cried out, "He hath lain four years in his grave, wherefore he stinketh." But the Republicans said, "Yet shall we raise him? And he shall be perfumed o'er, and anointed with moderation, that he may become a New Nixon." 
And they said unto him, "Richard, rise, and come forth." And lo, he came forth, bound hand and foot with winding-sheets, and they took them from him, and brought him a New Image. And they said, "The first Nixon was of the Earth. The last is of the Spirit." And the Spirit of God lighted upon him like a dove. 
And he said, "I came back, for he that loseth the election shall win it, and the last shall be first. But is it not meet that I should have a running-mate?" And they brought him Agnew, and together they journeyed forth across the land, like unto living men.

Track 8 – The Book of Hubert

There was a man in the Land of Us whose name was Hubert. And that man was perfect and upright, and one that feared LBJ and eschewed dissent. In the days of his youth, he had known Liberalism, and when the Liberals came not unto the House of LBJ, and cursed him in their hearts, Hubert sinned not, nor charged LBJ foolishly. Thus said Hubert continually, "Naked came I out of the Senate, and naked shall I return, ere I defy my maker! For LBJ giveth, and LBJ taketh away. Blessed be the name of Texas."
And the Democrats went unto Chicago that they might rejoice, and take unto themselves a new King. And they came every one, from his own place. And in this congregation were Jesse and his cohorts from the deserts of the West, followers unto the slain Bobby, whose hearts were sore afflicted. And there was Julian of Bond, and Lester, wielder of the mighty Axe Handle, and Connally, boss unto the Ranch Hands; and foremost among them was Daley, Lord of Hosts, and Maker of Kings.
And LBJ said unto his Captains, "Have ye considered my Servant Hubert, a perfect and upright man? One who feareth me and walketh in my ways? Yea, though he talketh with the Tongue of the Liberals, he shall not forsake me, for his supporters are few, and full of Labor." 
And when the people heard that The Election should fall upon Hubert they were dismayed, and rushed into the streets shouting, "Should not the multitude of lies be answered? Should a man full of Talk be justified?"
And the Hippites and the Yippites and the followers of Eugene came forth, and jeered, wherefore did Daley summon unto him his hosts, and say unto them, "Let us welcome these children unto Chicago. Let us lay out a carpet of red. Let us silence this bleating of the sheep, smite them, and deliver them unto my hand." And they smote the children. There stood a watchman on a tower, and his name was Walter the Cronkite, he cried out against the slaughter of the innocent. Wherefore did Hubert win the nomination, but it was dust and ashes in his mouth, and his words were as sounding brass and tinkling cymbal, and he was covered in boils. 
And the followers of Eugene cried unto him, "Thou has lost thine integrity! Go worship LBJ, and be damned." And damned if he wasn't.

Track 9 – The Ascension

Now Nixon came unto the people, and lifted his arms high and showed them the palms of his hands, that they might see the marks of his crucifixion and marvel at his resurrection. And the people were sore amazed, and he cried out to them, "Behold the Man! Nixon's the one! I am the Re-Election and the Right!" And they regarded him but as a Fisher of Votes, and believed him not. His enemies hissed and cried, "Deliver us from Tricky Dick", and asked, "Wouldst buy a used chariot from this man?" 
But Richard said unto them, "Verily, when I was young I girded up my loins and smeared with a mighty hand, and mine enemies cried out against me and said 'Beware, beware', then I knew that I had sinned. And I suffered wretchedness and desolation of the spirit, and from the Electoral College I dropped out. But lo, I am born again. Wherefore loveth me, feed my sheep, and get ye unto the Precincts! And baptise the Unbelievers, in the name of the Father, the Son, and the Holy Spiro."
And it came to pass that the voters blessed him. And the new Pharaoh was received up into heaven, and sat on the right hand of GOP, for the Republicans were in the temple, praising and blessing Richard.
Now for the first hundred days, Richard wandered in the wilderness of Washington, from the Deserts of Dissent, to the Mountains of Moratorium, seeking the Signs of the Times. But there came unto Richard the Pharisees, and certain of the Scribes, and the young men who studied not for war, for they had read the gospel according to John the Leftist; and they grew hair, and wore coats of many colours, so that Solomon in all his glory was not arrayed like one of these. 
And the Pharisees asked, "What of the inflation?" And Richard replied, "Glad am I that thou hast asked that question." And the Scribes asked, "What of integration?" And Richard replied, "I wouldst make myself perfectly clear on that point." And the young men cried, "When shall we have peace?" And Richard replied, "Let me say this, and let us make no mistake about it." Whereupon did Richard summon his Silent Majority and he sayeth unto them: "Gird up thy loins, for the Day of Judgement is soon at hand. Battle with all thine strength, lest the Democrats return again." And the Suburbs cheered him. And there was great reaction, yea, even unto Orange County.
Wherefore verily, I say unto you, my brethren: Let Us Pray.

Releases
The album was released by Mediarts (41–2) on August 1, 1970, as both an LP record, and an 8-track tape.

The album was subsequently reissued in 1972, by United Artists Records (UAS-5521), who had purchased Mediarts by that time.

Aftermath
In the aftermath of the album's release, in 1971 Welles found himself on the receiving end of a tax audit from the Nixon administration, which forced him to put several projects on hold (most notably his The Other Side of the Wind), in favour of more lucrative work to pay off his tax debt. It has been suggested by several Welles biographers that the tax audit was prompted by the Nixon administration in retaliation for The Begatting of the President.<ref>Jonathan Rosenbaum, 'Welles's Career: A Chronology', in Orson Welles and Peter Bogdanovich, 'This is Orson Welles, 2nd edition (New York: Da Capo Press, 1998), p. 436.</ref> This claim is difficult to verify, though – on the one hand, the Nixon administration did indeed keep an "enemies list", of left-wingers in the media and politics. On the other hand, Welles did not appear on any known version of the list, he had long maintained a highly unorthodox series of tax arrangements, and a 1973 report by the Congressional Joint Committee on Internal Revenue Taxation concluded that people on the "Enemies" list had not'' been subjected to an unusual number of tax audits.

Track listing

Side 1
 L. B. Jenesis (2:13)
 The Defoliation of Eden (3:54)
 Burn, Pharaoh, Burn (3:45)
 The Coming of Richard (3:24)

Side 2
 The Pacification of Goliath (3:06)
 Paradise Bossed (3:04)
 The Raising of Richard (2:08)
 The Book of Hubert (2:35)
 The Ascension (3:00)

References

External links
 The Begatting of the President, Internet Archive
 The Begatting of the President, WorldCat 
 Mediarts album discography and history

 

1970 albums
Mediarts Records albums
Orson Welles albums